Southern England, also known as South of England or The South, is sub-national part of England; with cultural, economic and political differing from both the Midlands and the North, the Midlands being a dialect chain in a notable north–south divide of England. The sub-national area's official population is nearly 28 million and an area of : roughly 40% of United Kingdom's population and approximately a quarter of its area.

Influential, geographic and political divisions have created multiple internal identities to the sub-national area of England. The influential divide is defined by closeness to the capital; the Greater London itself, the Home Counties and outer areas. The Home Counties identify in a similar way to the neighbouring English Midlands, in this case sharing culture with London and the outer areas yet identifying as separate to each. The geographic split is north-east (fenlands), south (downlands and a coastal plain) and west (following the River Thames to the Bristol channel and a peninsula). The north-east fenlands for example have been affected by the London's expansion; the traditional Cockney dialect's population of London's East End have moved out to the north and east Home Counties with a knock on effect to East Anglia's population. The political divide is the International Territorial Level; the regional level defines the south as London, the South East, the South West and the East

Definitions
For official purposes, the UK government does not refer to Southern England as a single entity, but the Office for National Statistics divides UK into twelve regions. In England, the North West, North East and Yorkshire and the Humber make up the North ("centre-north"); the West Midlands and East Midlands (as well as Wales) make up the Midlands ("centre-south") and the rest of England make up the South.

Culturally speaking, the majority of people think that the South consists of the South East (92%), Greater London (88%), South West (87%),  and to lesser extent the East of England (57%). However, 35% of people surveyed placed the East of England as part of the Midlands. Generally people in the North tend to put the East of England in the South more than people in the South or Midlands.

Geography 

The South has a land border with the Midlands and a sea border with France, Belgium and the Netherlands.  

The South is generally more low-lying than the North. There are a number of hill ranges, such as the Cotswolds and the Chilterns.

London is the largest city in the South of England and is the capital of the United Kingdom. The London Metropolitan Area has a population of 14.2 million (2019), making it the largest metropolitan area in Europe.

Demographics

Language

English 

English is the native language of the English people and the main language spoken in the South.

The South of England has a dialect and accent distinct from that of other parts of the UK. Due to the prominence of the South in media and politics, Standard British English is largely based on the English spoken in the South. For example, the standard British accent, Received Pronunciation, is very similar to the educated speech of London, Oxford and Cambridge.

Cornish 
Cornish is a revived language spoken in Cornwall and is an important part of the identity and culture of the Cornish people.

People
People often apply the terms "southern" and "south" loosely, without deeper consideration of the geographical identities of Southern England. This can cause confusion over the depth of affiliation between its areas. As in much of the rest of England, people tend to have a deeper affiliation to their county or city. Thus, residents of Essex are unlikely to feel much affinity with people in Oxfordshire. Similarly, there is a strong distinction between natives of the south-west and south-east. The broadcaster Stuart Maconie has noted that culturally "there's a bottom half of England [...] but there isn't a south in the same way that there's a north".

Health

One major manifestation of the North–South divide is in health and life expectancy statistics. All three Northern England statistical regions have lower than average life expectancies and higher than average rates of cancer, circulatory disease and respiratory disease. The South of England has a higher life expectancy than the North, however, regional differences do seem to be slowly narrowing: between 1991–1993 and 2012–2014, life expectancy in the North East increased by 6.0 years and in the North West by 5.8 years, the fastest increase in any region outside London, and the gap between life expectancy in the North East and South East is now 2.5 years, down from 2.9 in 1993. Furthermore, all such figures represent an average – affluent northern towns such as Harrogate have higher life expectancies than less affluent areas of the South such as Southampton or Plymouth.

Education
The South of England has a number of world-renowned universities, such as the ancient universities of Oxford and Cambridge, and many Russell Group universities, such as Imperial College London, University of Exeter and the London School of Economics.

Sport

Rugby

The sport of rugby experienced a schism in 1895 with many teams based in Yorkshire, Lancashire and surrounding areas breaking from the Rugby Football Union and forming their own League. The disagreement that led to the split was over the issue of professional payments, and "broken time" or injury payments. There is a perception that league is the code of rugby played in the north, whilst union is the code played in the south. One of the biggest derbies in Southern England is the West Country derby (Bath v Gloucester).

Football
The South Coast Derby is used to describe football matches played mainly between Portsmouth Football Club and Southampton Football Club.

Other major derbies in Southern England are West Country derbies and London derbies.

Divisions

Regions and ceremonial counties
Southern England consists of four regions and 22 counties: the East of England, London, South East and South West. Ceremonial counties are:

Devolution
They is a network of local enterprise partnerships, some areas are further devolved:

Historic counties

The historic counties ceased to be used for any administrative purpose in 1899 but remain important to some people, notably for county cricket.

Other

See also
 Constitutional status of Cornwall
 European Parliament constituencies in the United Kingdom
 Home Counties
 North–South divide in England
 North–South divide in the United Kingdom
 Regions of England
 Subdivisions of England
Lloegyr

References

 
Regions of England